KISS Radio in Taiwan plays the latest Chinese music and some English, Japanese and Korean top 40 songs.  There is live streaming from the station in Kaohsiung.

History
KISS Radio was launched on 14 February 1995. KISS Radio is the first legal private FM radio station in Kaohsiung.

Programs
 Kiss Morning - a news and music program during the morning hours in Taiwan.  In the U.S. and Canada, this broadcast would occur sometime around 7 p.m. Eastern Time.

List of "KISS Radio" Taiwan stations

See also
 Media of Taiwan

External links
KISS Radio 

Mandarin-language radio stations
Radio stations in Taiwan
Mass media in Taichung
Mass media in Kaohsiung